Michael George Lincoln (born April 10, 1975) is a former Major League Baseball relief pitcher. He played at Casa Roble High School, American River College and the University of Tennessee. Drafted in the 13th round of the 1996 Major League Baseball Draft by the Minnesota Twins, he made his major league debut on April 7, 1999.

Lincoln had played for the Minnesota Twins, Pittsburgh Pirates, and St. Louis Cardinals before signing as a free agent with the Cincinnati Reds on February 5, to a minor league contract with an invitation to spring training. He made the team out of spring training and went 2-5 with a 4.48 ERA in 64 games. On December 4, Lincoln signed a two-year contract to stay with the Reds.

References

External links

1975 births
Living people
Baseball players from California
St. Louis Cardinals players
Minnesota Twins players
Pittsburgh Pirates players
Cincinnati Reds players
Major League Baseball pitchers
Tennessee Volunteers baseball players
Fort Myers Miracle players
Salt Lake Buzz players
Nashville Sounds players
American River Beavers baseball players
People from Carmichael, California